Lakhwinder Shabla (born 24 February 1971) is an Indian German actor, theatre artist, film producer, writer, director and entrepreneur of Indian descent based in Munich, Germany. He is primarily known for his work in international cinema.

Lakhwinder co-produced films such as Vaapsi (2016), Delhi to Lahore (2014), a German language film titled Kopfwäsche (English translation: Brainwash), and a Bollywood film titled Raja Abroadiya.

The Punjabi movie Vaapsi was extensively shot in Punjab, India, and Germany and was released on 3 June 2016 in India, the US, and Canada. Raja Abroadiya was released worldwide on 16 March 2018.

25 Years later, a German film, is currently in post-production, with an expected worldwide release after the coronavirus pandemic.

Filmography

References

Punjabi people
Film producers from Punjab, India
German people of Indian descent
1971 births
Living people